was a Japanese jujutsu practitioner and judoka. A master of several styles, he was a contemporary to Jigoro Kano in the creation of a style that synthesized them all, and opposed the early judo movement before later joining it.

Biography
Okuda started learning jujutsu from his childhood at his father Yoshikatsu's dojo. He first started in the native Fukuno-ryū style, but later branched off to the more popular Kitō-ryū and Tenjin Shinyō-ryū, training under master Takeshi Sawada. Legend has that Okuda formed part of the Shinsengumi, and it was even rumored that he was one of the killers of Ryoma Sakamoto in 1867, but nothing of this was ever proven. In 1868, the young Okuda became part of the Shōgitai and participated in the Boshin War, managing to survive the loss of his unit at the Battle of Ueno.

In 1876, Okuda had the chance to meet Takamori Saigo, his former enemy in the Boshin War. Learning that Okuda was a jujutsu expert, Saigo hired him as an instructor in his samurai school in Kagoshima. However, with the beginning of the Satsuma Rebellion, Okuda resigned and moved to Yokohama, becoming a freelance jujutsu teacher. He eventually landed in Tokyo, where he fought in 1879 a challenge match against an American wrestler at the Shibusawa Library. Although Okuda was outweighed to the point of looking like a child next to his opponent, he won the match, throwing the American down with seoi nage and tomoe nage. The same year, Okuda opened a Kitō-ryū dojo, and became a hand-to-hand instructor for several police services, among them the prestigious Tokyo Metropolitan Police Department.

In 1884, while still a police teacher, Okuda created a personal jujutsu style, which integrated all the knowledge from the multiple styles he knew and researched. He aspired to integrate all the jujutsu styles in Japan, though it seems he never followed up with the idea. He did train with other stylists, mainly the eminent Yoshin-ryū school led by Hikosuke Totsuka, where he became friends with its exponent Morikichi Otake and fellow Tenjin Shinyō-ryū practitioner Daihachi Ichikawa. This alignement to the Totsuka school ironically pitted Okuda against another integrator of jujutsu, Jigoro Kano, whose Kodokan dojo was becoming infamous in the jujutsu community for its heterodoxy. In 1885, Ichikawa, Otake and Okuda performed a dojoyaburi on the Kodokan, leading Okuda to fight a bout against Shiro Saigo. Though Okuda was taller and heavier, he was defeated, being thrown repeatedly by koshi nage and deashi barai before Saigō finished him by yama arashi. Okuda suffered a concussion and had to be carried away.

Okuda didn't participate further in the Kodokan-Totsuka rivalry, and in 1893 he moved his field of activity to the Iwate Prefecture by invitation of governor Ichizo Hattori. As a consequence, he was not among the jujutsu masters gathered by Kano at the Dai Nippon Butoku Kai to inaugurate its jujutsu division in 1895 either. In 1901, he opened a judo dojo in the city of Morioka, and he became an usual attender of tournaments and events while keeping his police teacher job. His high knowledge and personal approach to throws were popularly nicknamed his , possibly in reference to his purported participation in the killings of the Shinsengumi.

Okuda had a last highlight in 1903 when he faced a young Kyuzo Mifune in a sparring, throwing him four times, though not without predicting Mifune would become a judo legend. Afterwards, he dedicated himself to teaching, becoming the master of judo historian Fukuichiro Haruyama. Okuda died in his house in 1931.

References

1854 births
1931 deaths
Hatamoto
Shinsengumi
People of the Boshin War
Japanese jujutsuka
Japanese male judoka
Martial arts school founders
Sportspeople from Fukushima Prefecture